Witold Milewski (1817–1889) was a Polish mathematician, physicist, and pedagogue.

In 1853 he became director of the Gymnasium in Trzemeszno.

References

Adam Galos "Franciszek Witold Milewski" in Polski Słownik Biograficzny vol. 21 p. 216 (according to )
Jaroslaw Biernaczyk, Witold Milewski in Ostroviensis Alma Mater – Book of Remembrance – Non omnis moriar, Volume X, 2003 Ostrow Wielkopolski

1817 births
1889 deaths
19th-century Polish mathematicians
19th-century Polish physicists